Foreign relations of Kazakhstan are primarily based on economic and political security. The Nazarbayev administration has tried to balance relations with Russia and the United States by sending petroleum and natural gas to its northern neighbor at artificially low prices while assisting the U.S. in the War on Terror. Kazakhstan is a member of the United Nations, Collective Security Treaty Organization, Organization for Security and Co-operation in Europe (which it chaired in 2010), North Atlantic Cooperation Council, Commonwealth of Independent States, the Shanghai Cooperation Organisation, and NATO's Partnership for Peace program. Kazakhstan established a customs union with Russia and Belarus, transformed into the Eurasian Economical Community then in 2015 into the Eurasian Economic Union. President Nazarbayev has prioritized economic diplomacy into Kazakhstan's foreign policy.

Kazakhstan has a "multi-vector" foreign policy, i.e. a triangulation between the major powers of Russia, China and the US.  Kazakhstan has called for “intra-regional integration in Central Asia” and international integration of the region.

In December 2010, Kazakhstan held the first OSCE summit since 1999.

Multilateral agreements 
In 2015 Kazakhstan joined the Inter-American Convention on Mutual Assistance in Criminal Matters. In September the Kazakh Senate ratified the Convention, which unites 26 countries, including the United States, South Korea, Canada, Mexico, Brazil, Venezuela and other countries.

Foreign policy 2014–20
Kazakhstan's main foreign policy efforts are focused on achieving the following goals:
 Measures that will ensure national security, defense capacity, sovereignty and territorial unity of the country;
 Strengthening peace through regional and global security;
 Sustainable international position and positive global image of Kazakhstan;
 Establishment of fair and democratic world order under the guiding and coordinating role of the United Nations Organization (UN);
 Further integration into the system of regional and international trade-economic relations;
 Creation of favorable external conditions for the successful implementation of the Strategy 2050; providing high living standards for the population; strengthening unity of the multi-national society; reinforcing rule of law and democratic institutions; protection of human rights and freedoms;
 Diversification, industrial-technological development and increased competitiveness of the national economy;
 Focusing the country onto the green development path and bringing it to the list of the 30 top-developed nations of the world;
 Saving the national-cultural uniqueness and following the own original way of the state development;
 Protection of the rights of personal, family and business interests of citizens and legal entities of the Republic of Kazakhstan;
 Support to Kazakh diaspora and Kazakh language nationally

Economic diplomacy
The Foreign Ministry of Kazakhstan assumed the new function of attracting investments to Kazakhstan in December 2018. As part of the new responsibilities, the Ministry oversees activities in attracting foreign investment and promoting Kazakh exports abroad, taking away these responsibilities from the reformed Ministry for Investment and Development. Two main objectives of Kazakhstan's economic diplomacy include comprehensive support of Kazakh business abroad and promotion of non-resource export. These objectives are set to help achieve the goals of diversifying the economy, creating new jobs, promoting innovative technologies and attracting foreign investors.

As part of economic diplomacy, Kazakhstan compiled a list of 40 countries its Foreign Ministry is to target in a bid to attract more foreign investment. Coordinated by the Foreign Ministry, Kazakhstan's diplomatic missions also address issues of strategic interest to Kazakhstan's business community in their receiving states.

Border issues
Not until 2005 did Kazakhstan, Russia, Turkmenistan, and Uzbekistan agree to begin demarcating their shared borders. No seabed boundary with Turkmenistan in the Caspian Sea has been agreed on and the usage of Caspian Sea water is a matter that remains unsettled by international agreement.

According to Bakhytzhan Sagintaev, first deputy prime minister, in 2015 Kazakhstan and China will sign an intergovernmental agreement on water allocation of the 24 transboundary rivers.

Nuclear weapons non-proliferation
When the Soviet Union collapsed in December 1991, Kazakhstan inherited 1,410 nuclear warheads and the Semipalatinsk nuclear-weapon test site. By April 1995, Kazakhstan had returned the warheads to Russia and, by July 2000, had destroyed the nuclear testing infrastructure at Semipalatinsk.

On December 2, 2009, UN secretary general Ban Ki-moon and the Republic of Kazakhstan designated August 29 as International Day against Nuclear Tests, the anniversary of the date that Kazakhstan closed the Semipalatinsk test site in 1991.

The contribution of Kazakhstan's President Nazarbayev to nuclear non-proliferation was highly recognized by Japan. During his visit to Japan in November 2016, Nursultan Nazarbayev was awarded the title of special honorary citizen of Hiroshima for his non-proliferation efforts.

Illicit drugs
Illegal cannabis and, to a lesser extent, opium production in Kazakhstan is an international issue since much of the crop ends up being sold in other countries, particularly in other member-states of Commonwealth of Independent States (CIS). In 1998, the United Nations Office on Drugs and Crime estimated that a "minimum of 1,517 tons of cannabis was harvested" in Kazakhstan.

With the fall of the Soviet Union, Kazakhstan became a major transit country for narcotics produced in Southwest Asia, primarily from Afghanistan. In 2001, Kazakh authorities reported 1,320 cases of drug trafficking and seized 18 metric tons of narcotics. However, this is viewed as a fraction of the actual total volume trafficked and widespread corruption continues to hamper government anti-drug efforts; Transparency International gave Kazakhstan a score of 2.2, on a scale of 0–10 with 0 indicating a "highly corrupt" state. Russia and other parts of Europe are the main markets for these drugs although drug use is growing in Kazakhstan as well.

KazAID
In November 2014 Kazakh Foreign Minister and Resident Representative of UNDP in Kazakhstan signed a project document supporting Kazakhstan's Foreign Affairs Ministry in forming KazAID, a system of Official Development Assistance (ODA). KazAID is the first ODA programme among the Central Asian states. The KazAID program implies technical assistance and humanitarian aid to Afghanistan. As of 2016, Kazakhstan provided Afghanistan with 20,000 tons of food products valued at some $20 million.

Kazakhstan's Ministry of Foreign Affairs with assistance of the UNDP and Japan International Cooperation Agency (JICA) leads ODA titled "Promoting Kazakhstan's ODA Cooperation with Afghanistan." The ODA is aimed at expanding economic independence and rights of Afghan women. The project marks Kazakhstan's first international cooperation for Afghanistan in the framework of national system of ODA.

As of 2017, Kazakhstan provided ODA worth approximately $450 million. Countries of Central Asia and Afghanistan are a priority for Kazakhstan's ODA.

Diplomatic relations

Bilateral relations

Multilateral

Africa
Kazakhstan has proactively worked to establish ties with African nations. Deputy Minister of Foreign Affairs Askar Mussinov participated in the 25th Assembly of Heads of State and Government of the African Union in Johannesburg, South Africa June 12–15.

Responding to an international call to help ease the suffering that Ebola is causing in West Africa, Kazakhstan transferred $50,000 to the UN Ebola Trust Fund in late 2014. After that Astana expressed its intention to provide $300,000 to the African Union's special project to fight Ebola.

The 1st day of the VIII Astana Economic Forum held on May 21, 2015, was dedicated to Africa and was titled "Africa – the Next Driver of the Global Economy". The Foreign Minister of Kazakhstan Erlan Idrissov noted: "We recognise that Africa is a continent with huge potential. It has enormous human capital and a large, young population.” More than 20 permanent representatives to the United Nations (UN) from Africa participated in the session.

On September 28, 2015, Kazakhstan and the UNDP signed a $2 million cost-sharing agreement launching a new program to help 45 African countries implement the UN's Sustainable Development Goals.

Americas
Kazakhstan's Deputy Foreign Minister Yerzhan Ashikbayev said that Kazakhstan is seeking "new perspectives" and boosting its relations with Latin American nations via a series of diplomatic visits.

Ashikbayev attended the 44th General Assembly of the Organization of American States in Asuncion, Paraguay on June 4. Kazakhstan was the largest delegation among the conference's 39 observer nations.

The Secretary General of the Organization of American States (OAS), José Miguel Insulza, on June 3 met with the Deputy Foreign Minister, Yerzhan Ashikbayev, in Asunción, Paraguay, for the 44th OAS General Assembly where Ashikbayev presented a contribution to help fund important OAS programs.

Foreign Minister Erlan Idrissov conducted a four-day visit to Mexico on September 17–20, 2014. During his visit Idrissov met with Mexican Economy Secretary Ildefonso Guajardo, Foreign Secretary Jose Antonio Meade, former President Vincente Fox, other senior officials and business leaders. The Minister and his delegation will view the future site of Kazakhstan's embassy in Mexico City.
Idrissov said that the main objective of his visit was to build a bridge between Latin America and Eurasia. The Foreign Minister underlined that economic and trade collaboration with Kazakhstan will allow investors to reach neighboring markets, such as Russia and China. Idrissov also said that Kazakhstan seeks to expand its presence in Latin America and considers Mexico as a strategic ally in building these relations, while Kazakhstan can offer the same support to Mexico in the Eurasian region.

Asia

Europe

European Free Trade Association 
Delegations from the EFTA States, Iceland, Liechtenstein, Norway and Switzerland met with Russia, Belarus and Kazakhstan for a first round of negotiations on a broad-based Free Trade Agreement on January 11–13, 2011 in Geneva.

The launching of EFTA-Russia/Belarus/Kazakhstan free trade negotiations had been announced in November 2010 by Ministers from the seven participating States, following a preparatory process including a Joint Feasibility Study.

The 11th round of free trade negotiations was conducted from January 27 to 30, 2014 in Astana, Kazakhstan. A 12th round of negotiations scheduled for April 2014 has been postponed. No new dates have been set yet.

European Union

The Partnership and Cooperation Agreement (PCA) with Kazakhstan has been the legal framework for European Union-Kazakhstan bilateral relations since it entered into force in 1999. In November 2006 a Memorandum of Understanding on cooperation in the field of energy between the EU and Kazakhstan has been signed establishing the basis for enhanced cooperation.

The future European Commission assistance will focus on the following priority areas: promotion of the ongoing reform process at political, economic, judiciary and social level, infrastructure building, and cooperation in the energy sector.

The overall EU co-operation objectives, policy responses and priority fields for Central Asia can be found in the EC Regional Strategy Paper for Central Asia 2007–2013. In addition to the assistance under the Development Cooperation Instrument (DCI), Kazakhstan participates in several ongoing regional programs.

On January 20, 2015 Kazakhstan and the EU initialed the EU-Kazakhstan Enhanced Partnership and Cooperation Agreement. This agreement will greatly facilitate stronger political and economic relations between Kazakhstan and the EU. It will increase the flow of trade, services and investment between the parties and will contribute to Kazakhstan's political and social development.

Bilateral relations received a post-pandemic refocus with the EU visit by Kazakhstan's president in November 2021. The visit was the first to Europe by Tokayev since becoming president in 2019.

European countries

Oceania

NATO
Kazakhstan has been a member of NATO's Partnership for Peace since May 27, 1994.
In October 2014 Kazakhstan and NATO marked 20 years of cooperation within the Partnership for Peace. To that end, from October 6 to 10, 2014 a NATO delegation visited Kazakhstan to take part in a series of public diplomacy events. Among meetings with Kazakhstan's officials, the delegates also visited the Nazarbayev and the Gumilyov Eurasian National universities in Astana, where they delivered lectures explaining NATO's engagement with partners in the Central Asian region and briefed audiences on the key outcomes of the recent NATO Wales Summit, with particular focus on NATO's partnership policy and Afghanistan.

A NATO delegation also plans to visit Astana in the first half of 2015 and hold a joint event with the Kazakh side in the second half of 2015. The future NATO-Kazakhstan joint activities will be held in the framework of the Partnership for Peace program, which centres on the development and exchange of experience for peacekeeping forces.

Visa regimes 
At the 27th meeting of the Foreign Investors' Council, President Nazarbayev announced visa-free entry for citizens of the United States, the Netherlands, UK, France, Germany, Italy, Malaysia, the UAE, South Korea, and Japan. Currently Kazakhstan and the United States issue 5-year visas to citizens of each other.

This will fulfill a goal of diversifying the economy while also helping the world become more acquainted with Kazakhstan's cultural patrimony.  Since 2001 to 2012, Kazakhstan has doubled its tourism earnings. Experts expect that Kazakhstan will continue to benefit from tourism from the eased visa regime.

On July 15, 2014, Kazakhstan launched a pilot project of visa-free regime for 10 countries: UK, USA, Germany, France, Italy, the United Arab Emirates (UAE), Malaysia, the Netherlands, South Korea and Japan. Citizens of these countries can enter, exit and transit through Kazakhstan without a visa for visits of up to 15 calendar days at a time.

On June 26, 2015, Kazakhstan issued a resolution expanding the number of countries included in a trial visa-free regime and extended that regime until December 31, 2017. The list now includes 19 countries, including Australia, Belgium, Finland, France, Germany, Hungary, Italy, Japan, Malaysia, Monaco, Netherlands, Norway, Singapore, Spain, Sweden, Switzerland, the UAE, the U. K. and the U.S.

Starting from January 1, 2017, Kazakhstan introduced visa-free access for 20 developed countries. These countries include the OECD members, Malaysia, Monaco, the UAE and Singapore.

United Nations
Kazakhstan became a member of the United Nations on March 2, 1992, nearly three months after gaining independence.

During the General Assembly on November 12, 2012, Kazakhstan was elected to a seat on the United Nations Human Rights Council for the first time. Their seat is with the Asian Group and their term will expire in 2015.

At United Nations Day 2013, Foreign Minister Erlan Idrisov addressed the UN General Assembly saying the UN should develop a regional center in Almaty. Since the United Nations has no regional offices between Vienna and Bangkok, Almaty is home to 18 international organization's regional offices and would be vital to the development of Central Asia and its neighbors.

At the 68th Assembly of the United Nations, Foreign Minister Idrisov announced Kazakhstan's bid for a non-permanent seat on the United Nations Security Council for 2017–2018. So far they and Thailand have announced their bids.

In February 2015 the United Nations' specialized agency World Health Organization opened a new geographically dispersed office (GDO) for primary health care in Kazakhstan at the Kazakh National Medical University of S.Asfendiyarov in Almaty. According to the head the Kazakh Medical University, the GDO of the WHO's European Bureau in Almaty will be financed by the UN.

In July 2015 Kazakhstan was accepted to the Executive Council of the World Federation of UNESCO (WCF) Clubs at the ninth WCF World Congress, UNESCO Centres and Associations.

On May 6, 2016, Kazakh Foreign Minister Erlan Idrissov spoke at two high level meetings at the U.N. headquarters in New York. The Foreign Minister said that Kazakhstan was calling for a nuclear free world by 2045, the 100th anniversary of the United Nations.

Kazakhstan signed the Paris Climate Change Agreement on Aug 2 at UN Headquarters in New York. The Kazakh Senate ratified the Paris Agreement on October 27, 2016. Under the Paris Agreement, Kazakhstan has committed to cut its greenhouse gas emissions by 15-20% by 2030 up to the level observed in 1990.

In March 2017, Kazakhstan marked 25 years of its membership in the United Nations. To celebrate this anniversary, Kazakhstan opened the “Kazakhstan and the United Nations: Interaction for Peace” exhibition in the Museum of the Library of the First President of Kazakhstan. During 25 years of cooperation, the UN opened 15 representative offices in Kazakhstan, including the United Nations Development Programme (UNDP), the United Nations International Children's Emergency Fund (UNICEF), the United Nations Population Fund (UNFPA) and United Nations Educational, Scientific and Cultural Organisation (UNESCO), among others.

Astana is a host city of the Eighth International Forum on Energy for Sustainable Development that is planned to be held in June 2017. The Forum is co-organized through collaboration by Kazakhstan with the UN Regional Commissions, as well as UNDP, IEA, IAEA, IRENA, the World Bank, UNID, the Copenhagen Centre on Energy Efficiency, and the Renewable Energy Policy Network for the 21st Century.

United Nations Security Council

Kazakhstan, along with Sweden, Bolivia and Ethiopia, were elected to serve on Security Council for a two-year term, starting from January 1, 2017. Kazakhstan became the first Central Asian country to be elected as a non-permanent member of the UNSC. Kazakhstan assumed the chairmanship of  UNSC on January 1, 2018. According to Kazakhstan's Foreign Minister Kairat Abdrakhmanov, during this period Kazakhstan will focus on drawing attention on international community to the issues of Central Asia and Afghanistan.

Kazakhstan outlined priorities during its UNSC tenure. They included nuclear disarmament and non-proliferation, fight against terrorism and extremism, promotion of peacemaking and peace-building, as well as security and development issues in the Central Asian region.

President Nazarbayev's address to the UNSC was presented by the Foreign Minister of Kazakhstan at the ministerial-level open debate of the UNSC held on January 10, 2017. The address was based on the principles of the Kazakh President's earlier Manifesto “The World. The 21st Century.” It declares Kazakhstan's commitment to building a world free of nuclear weapons and to rid humanity of wars and conflicts.

President Nazarbayev chaired the January 18 UN Security Council briefing on WMD non-proliferation and related measures to better provide security for Central Asia. It was the first time a president of a Central Asian country chaired a UNSC briefing.

Peacekeeping
On October 31, 2018, Kazakhstan deployed 120 Kazakh peacekeepers to serve with the UN mission in furthering peace in south Lebanon. It was the first time Kazakh troops were serving with UNIFIL in the Mission's 40-year history. On August 20, 2020, Kazakhstan deployed a second group of 60 peacekeepers to the UNIFIL.

Shanghai Cooperation Organisation
Kazakhstan is one of the original founding members of the Shanghai Cooperation Organisation, known as the Shanghai Five. They formally began the organization on April 26, 1996, with the signing of the Treaty on Deepening Military Trust in Border Regions in Shanghai. Since then, Kazakhstan has become a very active member in global politics within the organization.

At the SCO Summit in Bishkek, Kyrygyzstan on September 20, 2013, Kazakhstan met with leaders to discuss many issues. One of the main issues discussed was the focus on regional stability for Afghanistan after the United States withdraws its troop. Kazakhstan also signed the Bishkek Declaration along with members and observers to find diplomatic solutions for Iran and Syria. On Syria, Kazakhstan wanted to help find a diplomatic solution that would not involve direct intervention due to the need of UN authorization. On Iran, Kazakhstan wanted to see a diplomatic solution between Iran and the P5+1 group for Iran to enrich uranium at levels for energy consumption.

In November 2016, Kazakhstan chaired first ever SCO human rights consultations. The meetings were held in Beijing and aimed at further consolidation of the SCO member states cooperation in human rights.

Astana hosted the 17th Shanghai Cooperation Organisation (SCO) summit June 8–9, 2017. The summit featured the ceremony of accession of India and Pakistan to the organization. Therefore, the total number of member states increased to eight: China, Kazakhstan, Kyrgyz Republic, Russia, Tajikistan, Uzbekistan, India, and Pakistan.

Other international organizations

Antarctic treaty
Kazakhstan joined the Antarctic Treaty in November 2014 being the 51st country to ratify it.

Kazakhstan had shown an interest in the Antarctic before, with officials even identifying it as a potential source of drinking water for the arid steppe nation. The country staged its first expedition to the South Pole in 2011.

Organisation for Economic Co-operation and Development (OECD)
On January 23 in Davos at the World Economic Forum, Prime Minister of Kazakhstan Karim Massimov and Secretary General of the Organisation for Economic Co-operation and Development (OECD) Angel Gurria signed a Memorandum of Understanding between Kazakhstan and the OECD on the implementation of the Country Program of Cooperation for 2015–2016.

In July 2016, it was announced that Kazakhstan was admitted to the OECD Competition Committee that aims to promote antitrust reforms. Kazakhstan is the first Central Asian country to join the committee.

Kazakhstan joined the Declaration on International Investment and Multinational Enterprises of the OECD and became an associated participant of the OECD Investment Committee in June 2017. OECD Investment Committee is the leading government forum for cooperation on international investment issues.

World Trade Organization
Kazakhstan applied for WTO accession on January 29, 1996. The accession negotiations between Kazakhstan and the WTO lasted 20 years and on November 30, 2015, the organization welcomed Kazakhstan as its 162nd Member.

In April 2017, the General Council of the WTO announced that Kazakhstan's Ambassador to Switzerland and Permanent Representative of the Republic of Kazakhstan to the UN structures Zhanar Aitzhanova would be the Chairperson of the WTO Committee for Trade and Environment in 2017.

World Anti-Crisis Conference
The 21st World Anti Crisis Conference was conducted with the support of the UN General Assembly Resolution A/RES/67/19International financial sistem and development from December 21, 2012, on May 23, 2013, within the framework of the VI Astana Economic Forum. Main outcome of the WAC I was the Astana Declaration and the guidelines of the World Anti-Crisis Plan developed using the contributions from the international expert community, the UN member states and the UN Secretariat.

The concept of the WAC Plan, based on democratic principles and the interests of all UN member states aims at developing effective measures to overcome the economic and financial crisis, preventing future recessions and ensuring long-term balanced growth of the global economy.

See also
 List of diplomatic missions in Kazakhstan
 List of diplomatic missions of Kazakhstan
 Terrorism in Kazakhstan

References

Further reading

External links
 Ministry of Foreign Affairs
 Overview of Kazakhstan's foreign policy